Run, Cougar, Run is a 1972 American Western film directed by Jerome Courtland and written by Louis Pelletier. The film stars Stuart Whitman, Frank Aletter, Lonny Chapman, Douglas Fowley, Harry Carey, Jr. and Alfonso Arau. The film was released on October 18, 1972, by Buena Vista Distribution.

Plot
Set in Utah, the film tells the story of a cougar whose mate has been killed by a hunter. She must raise her three cubs, teaching them to survive the harsh realities of the wilderness, while the hunter continues to track the animals with the intent to kill them.

Cast
Stuart Whitman as Hugh McRae
Frank Aletter as Sam Davis
Lonny Chapman as Harry Walker
Douglas Fowley as Joe Bickley 
Harry Carey, Jr. as Barney
Alfonso Arau as Etio

Production
Parts of the film were shot at Castle Valley, Arches, Seven mile Canyon, Dead Horse Point, and the La Sal Mountains in Utah.

See also
 List of American films of 1972

References

External links
 
 

1972 films
Walt Disney Pictures films
American Western (genre) films
1972 Western (genre) films
Films produced by James Algar
Films scored by Buddy Baker (composer)
Films shot in Utah
1970s English-language films
1970s American films
Films about cougars